Erick Christopher Sebayang (born July 30, 1983 in Indonesia) is a retired Indonesian professional basketball player. He plays for Pelita Jaya Esia Jakarta of the Indonesian basketball league.  He is also a member of the Indonesia national basketball team.

Sebayang competed for the Indonesia national basketball team at the FIBA Asia Championship 2009 for the first time.  He led the team in assists for the tournament with 1.6 per game.

References

1983 births
Living people
Indonesian men's basketball players
Pelita Jaya Esia players
People of Batak descent
Point guards
Shooting guards